Avaneeswaram is a small village located on Kunnicode-Pathanapuram road in Kollam district, Kerala. It is about 7 kilometers south of Pathanapuram town and 36 kilometers from Kollam. It is a part of Vilakkudy panchayat. Avaneeswaram has a FCI (Food corporation of India) storage facility. Economy of this village primarily is agricultural.  Most common farm produce includes coconut, tapioca, areca, and cashews.  Some rice cultivation is also seen.

Transport
The roads to Thalavoor and Pattazhy pass through Avaneesaram. Avaneeswaram is connected to Kollam city by Kollam-Punalur Broad gauge railway line. Avaneeshwaram railway station (Code: AVS) falls under the Madurai railway division of the Southern Railway Zone. It is a 'D-Class' Adersh Station.

Train services from Avaneeswaram

Worship centers

There are many worship centers in Avaneeswaram. Thanniyappankavu Sree Mahadevar Temple, St. Mary's Orthodox Church, India Pentecostal Church of God, Assemblies of God in India, Immanuel Marthoma Syrian church, St.Mary's Malankara Catholic church, Avaneeswaram Juma Ath etc. are some of them

St. Mary's Orthodox Church
St. Mary's Orthodox Church, is located in  Kottarakkara Punalur diocese of the  Malankara Orthodox Syrian Church.

History
The first chapel was built in 1957 october. In 1958 February 2 new church came into being exist. Holy Qurbana was conducted only in one day in month. Rev Fr C. Sachariah  was the first vicar. Vicar was acted as the first trustee and first secretary was C. J. Thomas, Muttatherill. There are 39 families in church in first time.
In 1968 construction of second church started. In 1974 completed the construction started worship.
In 2013, construction of third church started and in 2017 completed it. Now it is open for worship.

References

Villages in Kollam district